Viktor Mojžiš (born 2 January 1999) is a professional Slovak footballer who currently plays for Prameň Kováčová as a midfielder in the Tipos 3. Liga.

Club career
Viktor has twin brother Alexander, who is signed to Ružomberok.

FK Železiarne Podbrezová
Viktor Mojžiš made his professional Fortuna Liga debut for Železiarne Podbrezová against ViOn Zlaté Moravce on 10 March 2018, in a 1:0 away victory. He came on as a replacement for Matúš Mikuš, who got injured, after half an hour of play, but was substituted by Illia Tereshchenko with 15 minutes left. Podbrezová had won after a penalty goal by Dávid Leško from the 82nd minute.

References

External links
 FK Železiarne Podbrezová official club profile 
 
 Futbalnet profile 
 

1999 births
Living people
Sportspeople from Krupina
Slovak footballers
Association football midfielders
FK Železiarne Podbrezová players
ŠK Prameň Kováčová players
Slovak Super Liga players
3. Liga (Slovakia) players